SKC may refer to:

Education
 Salish Kootenai College, a Native American tribal college in Pablo, Montana, U.S.
 South Kent College, a former college in southeast England
 St Kevin's College, Melbourne, Australia

Sports
 Siófok KC, a Hungarian women's handball team
 Sporting Kansas City, a soccer club in Kansas, U.S.

Other uses
 Ma Manda language (ISO 639:skc), one of the Finisterre languages of Papua New Guinea
 Services Kinema Corporation, part of Services Sound and Vision Corporation
 SKC Group, a subsidiary company of SK Group
 Studentski Kulturni Centar, Belgrade
 Suki Airport (IATA: SKC), Western Province, Papua New Guinea